Blandy Benjamin Clarkson (March 15, 1890 – December 2, 1954) was an American football coach and college athletics administrator.  He was the 16th head football coach at the Virginia Military Institute (VMI) in Lexington, Virginia, serving for seven seasons, from 1920 to 1926, and compiling a record of 44–21–2.  Clarkson was also the longest tenured athletic director in VMI history, having served from 1926 to 1946. Prior to his time at VMI, Clarkson served as head coach at the Marion Military Institute from 1914 -1916 and again in 1919.

Head coaching record

References

External links 

 

1890 births
1954 deaths
American football tackles
Camp Gordon football players
VMI Keydets athletic directors
VMI Keydets football coaches
VMI Keydets football players
People from Bath County, Virginia
Coaches of American football from Virginia
Players of American football from Virginia